Samdup Lepcha is an Indian politician. He was elected to the Sikkim Legislative Assembly from Lachen-Mangan in the 2019 Sikkim Legislative Assembly election as a member of the Sikkim Krantikari Morcha. He is Minister of Public Works department and Cultural affairs & Heritage in P. S. Golay Cabinet.

References

1967 births
Living people
Sikkim Krantikari Morcha politicians
People from Mangan district
Sikkim MLAs 2019–2024
Lepcha people